Sorbo Serpico is a town and comune in the province of Avellino, Campania, southern Italy.  Three villages with the name Sorbo are Sorbo-Ocagnano on the island of Corsica, Sorbo Serpico in the region of Campania, and Sorbo San Basile in the region of Calabria.

References

Cities and towns in Campania